Sambu is a minor island in Riau Islands Province of Indonesia.
It is located on the north-western side of Batam island.

References

Riau Archipelago
Islands of Sumatra
Landforms of the Riau Islands